Studenicia is a genus of Ediacaran fauna which is approximately 635-545 million years old. All Ediacaran fauna are considered to be invertebrate Metazoans or multicellular organisms with no backbone.

Description 
The fossils are made of small casts of the body. Studenicia is a small round organism (plan view) approximately 1-2 centimeters in diameter, and flat (side view). It is distinguished from other Ediacaran genera such as Nemiana by the presence of the central tubercle and Studenicia has a simpler structure (lacking rings) than Tirasiana.

Diversity 
Gureev only documented one species of Studenicia which is known as Studenicia galeiforma.

Discovery 
Studenicia was discovered in the Studenitsa formation of the Dniester river, near Studenitsa village, Podolia, Ukraine. The fossil was discovered by Y. Gureev and first cataloged in 1983.

Distribution 
Studenicia has only been found in the Studenitsa formation of the Dniester river, near Studenitsa village, Podolia, Ukraine.

Ecology 
Studenecia was a sedentary organism that lived on lower plane stratification. The Studenitsa Formation outcrops are composed of grey sandstones, siltstones, and mudstones, with units of multi-grained sandstones. The outcrops have a total thickness of up to 60m in certain areas.

See also 
 List of Ediacaran genera

References 

Ediacaran life